Richard Proehl (born November 6, 1944) is a Republican member of the Kansas House of Representatives, representing the 7th district (Parsons in Labette County). He was elected to his first term on December 21, 2005.

Proehl received his bachelor's and master's degrees from Kansas State University and had worked in the banking industry for 35 years.

He has been active with a number of community organizations, including the Parsons Chamber of Commerce, Veterans of Foreign Wars, Lions Club, Red Cross, and the American Legion.

Committee membership
 Financial Institutions (Vice-Chair)
 Energy and Utilities
 Insurance
 Transportation

Major donors
The top 5 donors to Proehl's 2008 campaign were mostly professional associations:
1. Kansas Contractors Assoc 	$1,000 	
2. AT&T 	$750 	
3. Kansans for Lifesaving Cures 	$750
4. Kansas Bankers Assoc 	$600 	
5. Kansas Assoc of Realtors 	$500

External links
 Kansas Legislature - Richard Proehl
 Project Vote Smart profile
 Kansas Votes profile
 State Surge - Legislative and voting track record
 Follow the Money campaign contributions:
 2006, 2008

References

Republican Party members of the Kansas House of Representatives
Living people
1944 births
21st-century American politicians